Nuclear quadrupole resonance spectroscopy or NQR is a chemical analysis technique related to nuclear magnetic resonance (NMR). Unlike NMR, NQR transitions of nuclei can be detected in the absence of a magnetic field, and for this reason NQR spectroscopy is referred to as "zero Field NMR". The NQR resonance is mediated by the interaction of the electric field gradient (EFG) with the quadrupole moment of the nuclear charge distribution. Unlike NMR, NQR is applicable only to solids and not liquids, because in liquids the electric field gradient at the nucleus averages to zero (the EFG tensor is traceless). Because the EFG at the location of a nucleus in a given substance is determined primarily by the valence electrons involved in the particular bond with other nearby nuclei, the NQR frequency at which transitions occur is unique for a given substance.  A particular NQR frequency in a compound or crystal is proportional to the product of the nuclear quadrupole moment, a property of the nucleus, and the EFG in the neighborhood of the nucleus.  It is this product which is termed the nuclear quadrupole coupling constant for a given isotope in a material and can be found in tables of known NQR transitions. In NMR, an analogous but not identical phenomenon is the coupling constant, which is also the result of an internuclear interaction between nuclei in the analyte.

Principle
Any nucleus with more than one unpaired nuclear particle (protons or neutrons) will have a charge distribution which results in an electric quadrupole moment. Allowed nuclear energy levels are shifted unequally due to the interaction of the nuclear charge with an electric field gradient supplied by the non-uniform distribution of electron density (e.g. from bonding electrons) and/or surrounding ions.  As in the case of NMR, irradiation of the nucleus with a burst of RF electromagnetic radiation may result in absorption of some energy by the nucleus which can be viewed as a perturbation of the quadrupole energy level. Unlike the NMR case, NQR absorption takes place in the absence of an external magnetic field.  Application of an external static field to a quadrupolar nucleus splits the quadrupole levels by the energy predicted from the Zeeman interaction. The technique is very sensitive to the nature and symmetry of the bonding around the nucleus.  It can characterize phase transitions in solids when performed at varying temperature. Due to symmetry, the shifts become averaged to zero in the liquid phase, so NQR spectra can only be measured for solids.

Analogy with NMR
In the case of NMR, nuclei with spin ≥ 1/2 have a magnetic dipole moment so that their energies are split by a magnetic field, allowing resonance absorption of energy related to the Larmor frequency:

In the case of NQR, nuclei with spin ≥ 1, such as 14N, 17O, 35Cl and 63Cu, also have an electric quadrupole moment. The nuclear quadrupole moment is associated with non-spherical nuclear charge distributions. As such it is a measure of the degree to which the nuclear charge distribution deviates from that of a sphere; that is, the prolate or oblate shape of the nucleus.  NQR is a direct observation of the interaction of the quadrupole moment with the local electric field gradient (EFG) created by the electronic structure of its environment. The NQR transition frequencies are proportional to the product of the electric quadrupole moment of the nucleus and a measure of the strength of the local EFG: 

where q is related to the largest principal component of the EFG tensor at the nucleus.  is referred to as the quadrupole coupling constant.

In principle, the NQR experimenter could apply a specified EFG in order to influence  just as the NMR experimenter is free to choose the Larmor frequency by adjusting the magnetic field.  However, in solids, the strength of the EFG is many kV/m^2, making the application of EFG's for NQR in the manner that external magnetic fields are chosen for NMR impractical.  Consequently, the NQR spectrum of a substance is specific to the substance - and NQR spectrum is a so called "chemical fingerprint." Because NQR frequencies are not chosen by the experimenter, they can be difficult to find making NQR a technically difficult technique to carry out. Since NQR is done in an environment without a static (or DC) magnetic field, it is sometimes called "zero field NMR". Many NQR transition frequencies depend strongly upon temperature.

Derivation of resonance frequency 
Consider a nucleus with a non-zero quadrupole moment  and charge density , which is surrounded by a potential . This potential may be produced by the electrons as stated above, whose probability distribution might be non-isotropic in general. The potential energy in this system equals to the integral over the charge distribution  and the potential  within a domain :

One can write the potential as a Taylor-expansion at the center of the considered nucleus. This method corresponds to the multipole expansion in cartesian coordinates (note that the equations below use the Einstein sum-convention):

The first term involving  will not be relevant and can therefore be omitted. Since nuclei do not have an electric dipole moment , which would interact with the electric field , the first derivatives can also be neglected. One is therefore left with all nine combinations of second derivatives. However if one deals with a homogeneous oblate or prolate nucleus the matrix  will be diagonal and elements with  vanish. This leads to a simplification because the equation for the potential energy now contains only  the second derivatives in respect to the same variable:

The remaining terms in the integral are related to the charge distribution and hence the quadrupole moment. The formula can be simplified even further by introducing the electric field gradient  , choosing the z-axis as the one with the maximal principal component  and using the Laplace equation to obtain the proportionality written above. For an  nucleus one obtains with the frequency-energy relation :

Applications
There are several research groups around the world currently working on ways to use NQR to detect explosives.  Units designed to detect landmines and explosives concealed in luggage have been tested. A detection system consists of a radio frequency (RF) power source, a coil to produce the magnetic excitation field and a detector circuit which monitors for a RF NQR response coming from the explosive component of the object.

A fake device known as the ADE 651 claimed to exploit NQR to detect explosives but in fact could do no such thing. Nonetheless, the device was successfully sold for millions to dozens of countries, including the government of Iraq.

Another practical use for NQR is measuring the water/gas/oil coming out of an oil well in realtime.
This particular technique allows local or remote monitoring of the extraction process, calculation of the well's remaining capacity and the water/detergents ratio the input pump must send to efficiently extract oil.

Due to the strong temperature dependence of the NQR frequency, it can be used as a precise temperature sensor with resolution on the order of 10−4 °C.

References

Nuclear magnetic resonance